Vatican Council may refer to:

First Vatican Council (1869–1870), the 20th ecumenical council recognized by Roman Catholicism
Second Vatican Council (1962–1965), the 21st ecumenical council recognized by Roman Catholicism